Infante Diogo of Viseu (1450–1484) was the second son of Ferdinand, Duke of Viseu, and his wife Beatriz, Duchess of Viseu.

History
In 1472, when his older brother John, Duke of Viseu, died without issue, Diogo inherited his titles and estates as Duke of Viseu and Duke of Beja.

Diogo was a popular personality at the court of his cousin King John II, and together with Duke Fernando II of Braganza, he was the main target of King John's centralization policies. John II sought to limit the power of the upper nobility, which had increased greatly during the reign of John's father Afonso V of Portugal.

Duke Fernando II of Braganza, husband of Isabella of Viseu, the sister-in-law of King John II of Portugal and Diogo's sister, was the first victim of John's efforts against the Portuguese nobility.  He was imprisoned, tried and executed in Évora. Once his sister Eleanor of Viseu was married to the king, Diogo thought he was protected from the king's anger.

On two occasions, the king's life was in danger and as Diogo of Viseu remained the leader of the upper nobility against the King's policies, John II accused him of high treason and personally killed him.

After the execution, King John II called the duke's younger brother, Infante Manuel of Viseu, and showed him his brother's body. He promised Manuel that he would consider him his own son. At that moment, Manuel inherited his brother Diogo's titles and estates.

Duke Diogo never married, but when he was quite young he visited the Crown of Castile, where he had a love affair with Doña Leonor de Sotomaior y Portugal (great-granddaughter of King Pedro I of Portugal). With her he had a natural son, Afonso de Portugal. King Manuel I of Portugal granted this nephew, Afonso de Portugal, the position of 8th Constable of Portugal. Afonso's daughter and heir, Beatrice of Lara, married the 3rd Marquis of Vila Real.

Ancestry

See also
Duke of Beja
Duke of Viseu
List of Portuguese Dukedoms

Bibliography
”Nobreza de Portugal e do Brasil” – Vol. III, pages 544 and 545. Published by Zairol Lda., Lisbon 1989.

External links
 Genealogy of Diogo, 4th Duke of Viseu, in Portuguese

House of Aviz
Portuguese infantes
Dukes of Beja
Dukes of Viseu
Medieval Portuguese nobility
1450 births
1484 deaths
15th-century Portuguese people
Donatários of the Azores